Sir Edward Walter  (9 December 1823 – 26 February 1904) was a captain in the 8th Hussars of the British Army and the founder and commanding officer of the Corps of Commissionaires. He was knighted at Osborne in 1885.

References 

Knights Bachelor
44th Regiment of Foot officers
8th King's Royal Irish Hussars officers
Knights Commander of the Order of the Bath
1823 births
1904 deaths